In behaviorism, rate  of response is a ratio between two measurements with different units. Rate of responding is the number of responses per minute, or some other time unit. It is usually written as R. Its first major exponent was B.F. Skinner (1939). It is used in the Matching Law.

R = # of Responses/Unit of time = B/t

See also
 Rate of reinforcement

References
 Herrnstein, R.J. (1961). Relative and absolute strength of responses as a function of frequency of reinforcement. Journal of the Experimental Analysis of Behaviour, 4, 267–272.
 Herrnstein, R.J. (1970). On the law of effect. Journal of the Experimental Analysis of Behavior, 13, 243–266.
 Skinner, B.F. (1938). The behavior of organisms: An experimental analysis. , .

Behaviorism
Quantitative analysis of behavior
Response